Jeremiah Lucius 'Jerry' Nolan (20 November 1869 – 4 April 1947) was an Australian rules footballer who played for the Fitzroy Football Club in the Victorian Football League (VFL).

Nolan was a premiership player with Fitzroy in 1898 and played as a back pocket in the Grand Final that season. He kicked just one goal in his career, against Carlton at Brunswick Street Oval in 1898. His last game came early in the 1899 season, despite having played in 13 successive wins.

Nolan (also known as Lou Nolan) worked as a water supply engineer with the Melbourne & Metropolitan Board of Works where he worked for 43 years, retiring on 28 November 1934.

References

External links

 

1869 births
1947 deaths
Fitzroy Football Club players
Fitzroy Football Club Premiership players
Australian rules footballers from Melbourne
One-time VFL/AFL Premiership players
People from Williamstown, Victoria